was a station located on the Kurihara Den'en Railway Company Kurihara Den'en Railway Line in Kurihara, Miyagi Prefecture, Japan.

Line
Kurihara Den'en Railway Company Kurihara Den'en Railway Line

Surrounding area
Located on the north side of what was formerly Wakayanagi Town, there is a bank and a small commercial district on the south side of the station. Prefectural Road 4 and Highway 398 also lie to the south, as does the Hasama River.

History
20 December 1921: Station begins operation.
1 April 2007: Station ends operation.

Adjacent stations

Railway stations in Miyagi Prefecture
Kurihara Den'en Railway Line
Defunct railway stations in Japan
Railway stations in Japan opened in 1921
Railway stations closed in 2007